Chango Inc was a Toronto-based online marketing company with a focus on search retargeting and programmatic marketing. The company was founded in 2008, acquired by Rubicon Project in 2015 for $122 million, and closed down in 2017.

History
The company was founded in Toronto by Chris Sukornyk along with Mazdak Rezvan and Dax Hamman. In 2012, Chango appointed Paul McIntyre to lead its Platform Solutions group and hired Keith Lorizio as chief revenue officer. Chango was recognized in Deloitte's Technology Fast 50 program and was ranked first overall in Canada with a growth rate of 69,800%.

Rubicon shut down Chango in 2017 stating that the company did not meet performance expectations.

Funding
In June 2010, Chango raised $1.4 million in Series A funding from investors including Metamorphic Ventures, iNovia Capital and Extreme Venture Partners. The company secured a second round of funding in February 2011, followed by a third round of $12 million in funding in November 2012.

Product
Chango was one of the pioneers to offer Search Retargeting. The company serves display ads to potential customers based on their recent search activity. As of the first quarter of 2013, Chango was working with 75 of the top 500 Internet Retailers.

Chango claimed to be able to capture the recent search activity of hundreds of millions of users, using anonymous cookies. The company also re-targets display advertisement to users if they match a specific campaign. Display advertisement is purchased through a Demand Side Platform (DSP) that operates across multiple ad networks, such as appnexus, rubicon and double click.

Chango is a member of the Network Advertising Initiative (NAI). Chango and its partners offer search retargeting campaigns, and consumers have the option to opt out of them. The company says that it does not capture Personally Identifiable Information (PII).

In December 2012, Chango Inc. integrated directly with Facebook to bring search intent data to social media targeting.

More recently, Chango Inc released the industry's first programmatic marketing platform, which combines Data Management Platform (DMP) with Demand Side Platform (DSP) capabilities.

References

External links 

 https://web.archive.org/web/20110603061144/http://www.retargetingnews.com/2011/05/smx-toronto-panel-examines-the-latest-in-search-retargeting/
 https://web.archive.org/web/20110615183336/http://ad-tech.blogs.imediaconnection.com/2011/03/29/start-up-watch-cod-chango-is-it-time-for-you-to-start-search-retargeting/
 http://www.marketwire.com/press-release/Chango-Completes-425M-Series-B-Financing-to-Solidify-Lead-in-Search-Retargeting-1388466.htm
 http://www.adexchanger.com/ad-networks/chango-fund in /
 http://searchengineland.com/11-inventory-sources-for-keyword-marketers-45263
 http://vator.tv/news/2010-07-02-funding-roundup-week-ending-07-02-10
 http://www.adexchanger.com/ad-exchange-news/dsp-chango/
 https://web.archive.org/web/20110418205040/http://www.btobonline.com/apps/pbcs.dll/article?AID=%2F20100701%2FFREE%2F100709991%2F1001#seenit
 https://web.archive.org/web/20100704054635/http://www.dmwmedia.com/news/2010/06/30/chango-raises-14-million-search-historybased-ads
 http://www.adotas.com/2010/06/got-funds-foursquare-click-forensics-chango-see-big-bucks/
 http://www.imediaconnection.com/content/27071.asp

Marketing companies of Canada
Companies based in Toronto
2008 establishments in Ontario